Aurora is a town in Brookings County, South Dakota, United States. The population was 1,047 at the 2020 census.

History
Aurora was platted in 1880. It was named after Aurora, Illinois, by a settler from that place.

Geography
Aurora is located at  (44.283215, -96.686048).

Aurora has been assigned the ZIP code 57002, and the FIPS place code 02780.

Demographics

2010 census
As of the census of 2010, there were 532 people, 233 households, and 144 families living in the town. The racial makeup of the town was 95.5% White, 2.6% Native American, 0.2% Asian, and 1.7% from two or more races. Hispanic or Latino of any race were 0.9% of the population.

There were 233 households, of which 29.2% had children under the age of 18 living with them, 48.5% were married couples living together, 7.3% had a female householder with no husband present, 6.0% had a male householder with no wife present, and 38.2% were non-families. 30.9% of all households were made up of individuals, and 6.4% had someone living alone who was 65 years of age or older. The average household size was 2.28 and the average family size was 2.88.

The median age in the town was 33.8 years. 23.3% of residents were under the age of 18; 9.9% were between the ages of 18 and 24; 32.4% were from 25 to 44; 26.6% were from 45 to 64; and 7.9% were 65 years of age or older. The gender makeup of the town was 53.0% male and 47.0% female.

2000 census
As of the census of 2000, there were 500 people, 205 households, and 136 families living in the town. The population density was 1,090.5 people per square mile (419.7/km). There were 221 housing units at an average density of 482.0 per square mile (185.5/km). The racial makeup of the town was 98.00% White, 1.40% Native American, and 0.60% from two or more races.

There were 205 households, out of which 36.6% had children under the age of 18 living with them, 59.0% were married couples living together, 5.9% had a female householder with no husband present, and 33.2% were non-families. 27.8% of all households were made up of individuals, and 8.3% had someone living alone who was 65 years of age or older. The average household size was 2.44 and the average family size was 3.03.

In the town, the population was spread out, with 25.4% under the age of 18, 11.8% from 18 to 24, 32.0% from 25 to 44, 21.8% from 45 to 64, and 9.0% who were 65 years of age or older. The median age was 33 years. For every 100 females, there were 107.5 males. For every 100 females age 18 and over, there were 102.7 males.

The median income for a household in the town was $38,456, and the median income for a family was $43,500. Males had a median income of $26,953 versus $20,089 for females. The per capita income for the town was $15,819. None of the families and 2.4% of the population were living below the poverty line, including no under eighteens and 8.8% of those over 64.

Sports
The sole two sports teams in Aurora are both baseball teams, American Legion Baseball Post 230 (2002-Present) & the Aurora A’s (2000-2018), who became the Aurora Aces (2019-present).  Both programs play their home games at Langland Field (formerly referred to as Aurora Ballpark), dedicated on October 19, 2019 in memorial to Jake Langland (June 29, 1985 - June 1, 2019), who played three season with Post 230 (2003-05), co-managed the team in 2006, and played for the A’s 2006-07. Langland Field is located two blocks west of the city water tower, on Maple Ave., with the left field bordered by W. Pine St. and right field bordered by Oak Ave.  

The ballpark’s concession stand, bathrooms, and in-ground dugouts were installed for the 2002 season, its original Dakotronics scoreboard was installed for the 2003 season, its lights during the 2004 season (purchased by the city, with crane installation donated by the then new local ethanol plant, Verasun Energy. Players and their families provided volunteer labor for the lighting install.  Due to inoperability, the original scoreboard was replaced with an equivalent model, refurbished Dakotronics scoreboard in late 2019, during the Langland dedication (thanks to the orchestration of Alex Ohm, friend and legion teammate of Jake Langland).  In 2021, Bob Shelden Field (Brookings, SD) was renovated, and half of the original "Wenande Pressbox” (named for donator, Rick Wenande) was relocated by Terry Anderson to Langland Field and installed on an elevated platform behind the home plate bleachers.  Prior to this, Langland Field had no pressbox. In 2022, and due to city drainage issues, the city extracted the in-ground dugouts in favor of above-ground dugouts to-be-built for the 2023 season.

Post 230 is classified as a District 1A team, as it plays within the geographical area designated as District 1 by the stat ‘legion' commission and obtains at least a portion of its players from neighboring Brookings High School (a school possessing an "A" enrollment status under American Legion by-laws, which are based on population.  Despite the 1A designation, Post 230 plays the majority of its regular season games against "B" division opponents.  However, if electing to compete at the district tournament, Post 230 must compete against its 1A opponents, which are Brookings, Aberdeen, Watertown, and Huron. The team's colors have historically been blue with white, grey, and/or black.

The Aurora A's amateur baseball team (sponsored by Anderson Insurance, Brookings, SD), whose colors were black and athletic gold, competed in the Eastern Dakota League (EDL) (Class B designation) of the South Dakota Amateur Baseball Association (SDABA).  The team competed in Class B until the 2012 season, whereby it began competing at the Class A level due to possessing greater-than four players on its roster from neighboring Brookings, SD (Class A, based on population). It was allowed to continue to play its regular season games in the Class B EDL, similar to the Castlewood Ravens, who equally possessed greater-than 4 players from Class A towns, like Watertown and Brookings.   

At its peak (2006-2010), the Aurora A’s won the EDL district championship multiple times, and simultaneously possessed up to six current or former collegiate baseball players on its roster at once, from schools such as South Dakota State University (Brookings, SD), Minnesota State Community & Technical College (Fergus Falls, MN), Gallaudet University (Washington D.C.), Ridgewater University (Wilmar, MN), & Augustana University (Sioux Falls, SD). Over the years, other current and former collegiate players would play for the organization from colleges, such as St. Cloud Technical & Community College (St. Cloud, MN), Century College (White Bear Lake, MN), & Northern State University (Aberdeen, SD). In 2008, the team featured its first and only Major League Baseball draftee, Spearfish native, Derek Ver Helst (LHP), who was selected out of high school by the Pittsburgh Pirates in the 21st round of the 1999 MLB draft. Derek had previously also played with the Clark Traders (Clark, SD) of the EDL.

After the 2015 season, the team's veteran players combined with players mostly residing in Brookings for revive the Brookings Cubs (Class A), which did not have a team in 2015 due to lack of player numbers.  This left the Aurora A’s as an entirely new-look, young team beginning the 2016 season and featured only two players possessing collegiate experience (both Northern State University, Aberdeen, SD).

In 2019, this iteration of the amateur team renamed itself the Aurora Aces (sponsored by Casino 2000, Brookings, SD), changing its colors to red and white.  In 2021, a successful petition with the SDABA allowed the team to compete at ‘B’ team to remain competitive. This status was to be revisited each successive year.

See also
 List of towns in South Dakota

References

External links

 

Towns in Brookings County, South Dakota
Towns in South Dakota
1880 establishments in Dakota Territory
Populated places established in 1880